The 1972–73 Cleveland Crusaders season was the first season of operation of the new Cleveland Crusaders in the new World Hockey Association. The team qualified for the playoffs and won its first series, before losing in the Division semi-final.

Offseason

Regular season

Final standings

Game log

Playoffs

Cleveland Crusaders 4, Philadelphia Blazers 0 - Semifinals

New England Whalers 4, Cleveland Crusaders 1 - Division Finals

Player stats

Note: Pos = Position; GP = Games played; G = Goals; A = Assists; Pts = Points; +/- = plus/minus; PIM = Penalty minutes; PPG = Power-play goals; SHG = Short-handed goals; GWG = Game-winning goals
      MIN = Minutes played; W = Wins; L = Losses; T = Ties; GA = Goals-against; GAA = Goals-against average; SO = Shutouts;

Awards and records

Transactions

Draft picks

Farm teams

See also
1972–73 WHA season

References

External links

Cleveland Crusaders seasons
Cleve
Cleve